Beverly is an unincorporated community in Bell County, Kentucky, United States. It was also known as Knuckles and Red Bird which was a coal town. Its post office is closed.

References

Unincorporated communities in Bell County, Kentucky
Unincorporated communities in Kentucky
Coal towns in Kentucky